The 2011 Cherwell District Council election took place on 5 May 2011 to elect members of Cherwell District Council in Oxfordshire, England. One third of the council was up for election and the Conservative Party stayed in overall control of the council.

In all 16 seats were contested, out of 50 on the council. The Conservative party remained in overall control with 43 seats, a net loss of just one seat. There was one Conservative gain, the Bicester South ward taken by Lynn Pratt from Liberal Democrat leader Nick Cotter, but Labour gained two seats from Conservative, with Patrick Cartledge regaining the Banbury Ruscote seat which he had lost to the Conservatives in 2008, and Andrew Beere taking Banbury Grimsbury and Castle by 15 votes, also from the Conservatives. Labour increased their council seats from two to four, whereas the loss of the Bicester South ward by the Liberal Democrat party left them with three councillors, and so were replaced by Labour as official opposition on the council.

After the election, the composition of the council was
Conservative 43
Labour 4
Liberal Democrat 3

Election result

Ward results

References

2011 English local elections
2011
2010s in Oxfordshire